Illizi  is a large province (wilaya) in the south-eastern corner of Algeria named after its eponymous seat.
It borders Ouargla Province to the north, Tunisia to the extreme northeast, Libya to the east, Djanet Province to the south and, to the west, In Salah Province and Tamanrasset Province. As of the 2008 census, the province had a population of 52,333 and an annual growth rate of 4.5%.

History
The province was created from Ouargla Province in 1984. In January 2013, a hostage crisis occurred in a natural gas facility near In Amenas.

Administrative divisions
The province is divided into 2 districts, which are further divided into 4 communes or municipalities.

Natural resources
The area is rich in natural gas. One of the most promising sites for natural gas production is the Ain Tsila gas field in the Isarene permit, some 57% of which is owned by the Irish company Petroceltic International, 18% by the Italian company Enel, and the rest by the Algerian government-owned Sonatrach. Reportedly, Petroceltic's 56.7% is worth between US$800 million and US$1 billion.

References

 
Tuareg
Provinces of Algeria
States and territories established in 1984